Mount Ascension is a prominent  mountain summit located in the Kenai Mountains, on the Kenai Peninsula, in the U.S. state of Alaska. The peak is near the mouth of Resurrection River into Resurrection Bay. The name Resurrection, referring to the Resurrection of Jesus, is overused for nearby landforms on the Kenai peninsula, as the mountain to the immediate south is Resurrection Peaks. This Ascension name is a variation of the theme. Mount Ascension's name was proposed in 1968 by the Mountaineering Club of Alaska, and officially adopted in 1969 by the United States Geological Survey. Access to the peak is via the Lost Lake Trail, and mountaineering skills are needed to reach the summit. In clear weather the immense Harding Icefield can be seen from the top. The first ascent of this peak was made October 6, 1968, by John Vincent Hoeman and his wife, Dr. Grace (Jansen) Hoeman.

Climate
Based on the Köppen climate classification, Mount Ascension is located in a subarctic climate zone with long, cold, snowy winters, and mild summers. Temperatures can drop below −20 °C with wind chill factors below −30 °C. This climate supports a spruce and hemlock forest on the lower slopes.

See also

List of mountain peaks of Alaska
Geology of Alaska

References

External links
 Mount Ascension Weather forecast
 Mt. Ascension: Flickr photo
 Mt. Ascension in winter: Flickr photo

Ascension
Ascension
Ascension
Ascension